ARPS may refer to:

Aerospace Research Pilot School
Amherst-Pelham Regional School District
Associate of the Royal Photographic Society
Auction rate preferred stock